WWIB 103.7 FM is a radio station that broadcasts a format of Adult Contemporary Christian music. Licensed to Hallie, Wisconsin, WWIB serves the Eau Claire - Chippewa Falls area and reaches northward to the Hayward area. It is also heard locally in La Crosse, Wisconsin through a translator on 93.7 FM, in Marshfield, Wisconsin on 93.5 FM, and in Wausau, Wisconsin on 94.3 FM. The station began broadcasting December 30, 1972.

Translators

References

External links 
WWIB's official website

Contemporary Christian radio stations in the United States
Radio stations established in 1972
1972 establishments in Wisconsin
WIB